Rauf Zulfugar oglu Adigozalov (22 November 1940 – 29 June 2002) was an Azerbaijani violinist and singer. He was the son of the singer Zulfugar Adigozalov, and the brother of the composer Vasif Adigozalov. He graduated from Moscow Conservatory (1965), and after graduation returned to Azerbaijan. He played in symphonic orchestra of the Azerbaijan SSR, and was a concertmaster. In 1974, he taught in Azerbaijan State Conservatory at cathedra of chamber ensemble. In 1992, he became associate professor, and in 1997 a professor.

In 1970, he performed as a singer and quite often combined vocal and instrumental numbers in one concert. Azerbaijani music, including Asker’s aria from “Arshin mal alan" musical comedy of Uzeyir Hajibeyov took an important place in vocal repertoire of Adigozalov.

Rauf Adigozalov was Honored Art Worker of Azerbaijan (1992).

References

1940 births
Musicians from Baku
2002 deaths
Azerbaijani classical violinists
Soviet male singers
20th-century Azerbaijani male singers
Azerbaijani professors
Moscow Conservatory alumni
20th-century violinists